Mabogo P. More is a South African philosopher working in the area of Black existentialism, including philosophical analysis of the life and work of Steve Biko. In 2015, More was awarded the Frantz Fanon Lifetime Achievement Award by the Caribbean Philosophical Association.

Books
 Biko: Philosophy, Identity and Liberation (2017)
 Looking Through Philosophy in Black: Memoirs (2018)
Sartre on Contingency: Antiblack Racism and Embodiment

References

Year of birth missing (living people)
Living people
Fanon scholars
20th-century South African philosophers
Existentialists
Academic staff of the University of Natal
South African philosophers
African philosophers